was a Japanese music industry executive who was the chairman of Recording Industry Association of Japan.

Personal life
Born in Saitama-ken, he learned the music of Japan while studying Business Administration at Keio University. He graduated in 1968 in the same school.

EMI days
Ishizaka became an inside director in 1968 before being promoted at Toshiba-EMI in 1991 and stayed until 1993. He was called "Mr. Beatles" for endless efforts of promoting the British band's albums in Japan.

PolyGram/Universal days
In 1998, Ishizaka became the executive director of Universal Music Japan. Three years later, he became the company's CEO, and in October 2006 he became the chairman until November 2009, when he retired. He was replaced as UMG Japan's CEO the same month by former A&R VP and Def Jam Japan GM Koike Kazuhiko.

RIAJ chairmanship
Ishizaka was the RIAJ's chairman from July 2007, until he was replaced by Sony Music Japan CEO Naoki Kitagawa in the RIAJ presidency in June 2011.

Warner days
In November 2011, Keiichi Ishizaka became the CEO and chairman of Warner Music Japan, replacing Hirokazu Tanaka who served as the acting head of the company since the October 2010 death of Takashi Yoshida. After three years, he resigned on April 1, 2014.

Awards
In November 2009, Ishizaka was awarded with a Medal of Honour with blue ribbon by the Government of Japan. He was later awarded the Order of the Rising Sun on November 3, 2015.

References 

1945 births
2016 deaths
Japanese chief executives
Keio University alumni
Japanese music industry executives
People from Saitama Prefecture
Universal Music Japan
Recipients of the Order of the Rising Sun, 3rd class